This list of notable people associated with Claremont McKenna College includes matriculating students, alumni, attendees, faculty, trustees, and honorary degree recipients of  Claremont McKenna College in Claremont, California.

Notable alumni

Politics

Nonprofit

Business

Academia

Entertainment

Military

Writing and journalism

Dropouts and transfers

Notable faculty 
Roderic Ai Camp- McKenna Professor of the Pacific Rim; author of 34 books on Mexico and Latin America; founding member of the Advisory Board, Mexico Institute, Woodrow Wilson Center, Smithsonian Institution, 2003-present; elected member of the Council on Foreign Relations, New York; Global Scholar, Woodrow Wilson Center, 2017-;recipient of the Medal of the Aztec Eagle, the highest honor bestowed to a foreigner for his contributions to Mexico.”
William Ascher - Donald C. McKenna Professor of Government and Economics; served as Dean of the Faculty from 2000 to 2005; prolific author and winner of the G. David Huntoon, Sr., Award for Superior Teaching
Fred Balitzer - professor of government. He was director of the Republican National Committee under President Ronald Reagan, chairman of Scholars for Reagan-Bush in 1984, and special emissary to the Sultan of Brunei. He helped bring about diplomatic relations with China and Israel and played a leading role in preventing efforts to make the District of Columbia a state.
Ross Eckert - professor of economics who dedicated his life to cleaning up the blood supply. The matter affected him personally as he was a hemophiliac who contracted HIV/AIDS from a bad transfusion. Eckert worked with Elliott on market-incentives to reduce congestion. He also worked to rescue the U.S. Laws of the Sea from degradation. (deceased)
Ward Elliott - researched market solutions to Los Angeles smog problem. Elliott drafted the economic-incentives of the Clean Air Act Amendments of 1990. Thanks to his efforts, the number of first-stage smog-alerts days declined from one day in three in the 1960s to only one day in 1997.
Diane Halpern - former president of the American Psychological Association
Eric Helland — Professor of Economics, Senior Staff Economist, President's Council of Economic Advisers (2003–2004)
Alan Heslop – Government consultant, founding director of the Rose Institute, felon, and former dean of faculty
Harry V. Jaffa - professor of political philosophy, scholar of the Lincoln-Douglas debates, Aristotelian virtue, and the American founding. The National Review once had a cover story that described Jaffa as "the foremost contemporary interpreter of the American political tradition."
Charles Kesler - editor of the Claremont Review of Books and noted conservative scholar
Jamaica Kincaid - novelist
Morcos Massoud - professor of Accounting at Claremont McKenna College since 1981. Publisher of numerous articles. Awarded CMC Presidential Award for Merit. 13 time recipient of the Glenn R. Huntoon Award for Superior Teaching. Recipient of CMC Alumni Association Jack Stark Distinguished Service Award. Recipient of John Faranda Student Service Award.
Kenneth P. Miller - professor of Government specializing in California politics, direct democracy, and state constitutional law. Miller is the Associate Director of the Rose Institute of State and Local Government, a research institute known for its expertise in redistricting, elections, demographic research, and public policy analysis.
Jonathan Petropoulos - historian and scholar of Holocaust-era looted art
Mort Sahl - speech writer for President John F. Kennedy; famed comedian
Michael Uhlmann - former Assistant Attorney General to President Gerald Ford; special assistant to President Ronald Reagan; reportedly convinced Justice Clarence Thomas to join the federal judiciary

References

Claremont McKenna College
Claremont McKenna College people
Claremont McKenna College